Guanqiao Station is a future elevated station of Line 4 of the Guangzhou Metro. It will be located at Guanqiao Village, Shilou Town, Panyu District, Guangzhou. The metro station will open in 2024.

References

Railway stations in Guangdong
Guangzhou Metro stations in Panyu District
Proposed Guangzhou Metro stations